An Extermination order is an order given by a government sanctioning mass removal or death.  The term is often associated with genocide.

Extermination orders were issued in conjunction with the following events:

 Armenian genocide
 California Genocide
 The Holocaust, which did not have an extermination order, involved the extermination of millions of Jews
Extermination camp, also known as "death camp"
Missouri Executive Order 44, often called the "Mormon Extermination Order" (alt. "exterminating order") within the Latter Day Saint movement, though it did not lead to a genocide but rather to a forced expatriation.
 The Order of Extermination of the Nayars by Tippu Sultan during Mysore's invasion of Kerala.

Extermination orders can also include:
 No quarter, a term that is used when an order is given for the complete extermination of an enemy, without accepting any offer of surrender
 Decimation (Roman army), a punishment in the Roman Army